Ambient Time Travellers is a various artists compilation album released on November 14, 1995, by Hypnotic Records.

Reception
Sonic Boom said "by placing a variety of ambient artists together you begin to understand the subtle differences within the ambient genre and are slowly able to identify each artist on its own, separate from entirety of one musical work, often a very difficult feat within the ambient realm of music."

Track listing

Personnel
Adapted from the Ambient Time Travellers liner notes.

Release history

References

External links 
 Ambient Time Travellers at Discogs (list of releases)

1995 compilation albums
Hypnotic Records compilation albums